"Drip Fed Fred" is a single by British band Madness from their 1999 album Wonderful, featuring Ian Dury on vocals. It was released as a single in January 2000, peaking at number 55 in the UK Singles Chart. It was the last song to which Dury would contribute his voice, before he died in March 2000.

Track listing
Two versions of the single were released on CD.

CD1
"Drip Fed Fred (The Conspiracy Mix)" 4:13 [Thompson/Barson]
"Elysium" 3:53 [Thompson/Woodgate]
"Light Of The Way" 2:41 [Smyth]

CD2
"Drip Fed Fred (The Conspiracy Mix)" 4:13 [Thompson/Barson]
"Elysium" 3:53 [Thompson/Woodgate]
"We Want Freddie" 3:41  [Thompson/Barson]

"The Conspiracy Mix" is an edited version of the album track with an altered rhythm track and an earlier fade out.
"We Want Freddie" is a demo version of the lead track, not featuring Ian Dury.

Charts

References

2000 singles
Madness (band) songs
Ian Dury songs
Songs written by Lee Thompson (saxophonist)
Songs written by Mike Barson
1999 songs
Virgin Records singles
Song recordings produced by Clive Langer
Song recordings produced by Alan Winstanley